Hans-Hermann Nissen (May 20, 1893, Danzig - March 28, 1980, Munich) was a German operatic bass-baritone, particularly associated with Wagner roles, one of the leading Wotan and Hans Sachs of the inter-war period.

He studied in Berlin with Julius Raatz-Brockmann, and made his debut at the Volksoper Berlin, as Kalif in Der Barbier von Bagdad, in 1924. He joined the Munich State Opera in 1925, where he remained until 1967, and was a regular guest at the Bayreuth Festival, where he quickly established himself as a leading Wagnerian.

Beginning in 1928, he made guest appearances outside Germany, singing at the Royal Opera House in London, the Paris Opéra, the Vienna State Opera, the Salzburg Festival, La Monnaie in Brussels, La Scala in Milan, and the Liceo in Barcelona. He made his American debut at the Chicago Civic Opera in 1930, and at the New York Metropolitan Opera in 1938.

Beside Wotan and Sachs, other notable roles included; Wolfram, Telramund, Kurwenal, Dutchman in The Flying Dutchman, Oreste in Elektra, and Barak in Die Frau ohne Schatten. He also tackled a few Verdi roles such as di Luna, Renato, Amonasro, among others.

Nissen possessed a rich and sonorous voice and an imposing stage presence.

Sources
 Operissimo.com

1893 births
1980 deaths
Operatic bass-baritones
20th-century German male opera singers